Emma Reed (May 30, 1925 – April 4, 2014) was an American athlete. She competed in the women's long jump and the women's high jump at the 1948 Summer Olympics.

References

External links
 

1925 births
2014 deaths
Athletes (track and field) at the 1948 Summer Olympics
American female long jumpers
American female high jumpers
Olympic track and field athletes of the United States
People from Warren County, Mississippi
21st-century American women